Love from a Stranger is the name of several works based on the short story Philomel Cottage written by Agatha Christie:

 Love from a Stranger (play), a 1936 play written by Frank Vosper based on the short story 
 Love from a Stranger (1937 film), a British film directed by Rowland V. Lee; released as A Night of Terror in the USA
 Love from a Stranger (1947 film), an American film directed by Richard Whorf; released as A Stranger Walked In in the United Kingdom
 Love from a Stranger (1938 TV play), a play directed by George More O'Ferrall starring Bernard Lee and Edna Best
 Love from a Stranger (1947 TV play), a play directed by George More O'Ferrall starring Joy Harington  and Henry Oscar